Itineris Early College High School is an independent public charter school that first opened in 2004. It was located in West Jordan, Utah, USA, on the campus of Salt Lake Community College. In 2014, The school was relocated to a new building nearby the Salt Lake Community College campus.

The school enables attendees to earn their associate’s degree concurrent with their high school diploma. Itineris has a wide variety of courses ranging from the sciences and mathematics to English and history. In junction with Salt Lake Community College, Itineris also has classes taught outside the campus that will help students achieve enough credits to receive their associate degree in biotechnology or general studies. Students can achieve up to two years of college credit at the same time as they are earning a high school diploma. Itineris Early College High School shares similar characteristics of other early college high schools that have been shown to improve learning and academic success for students.

Currently, there are more than twenty early college high schools in the US. The Jobs for the Future Early College High School Initiative, sponsored by the Bill & Melinda Gates Foundation in partnership with the Carnegie Corporation of New York, The Ford Foundation, and The W.K. Kellogg Foundation, has awarded more than $50 million in grant money to support approximately 100 new schools over the next five years.

References

External links
Itineris Early College High School

Public high schools in Utah
University-affiliated schools in the United States
Schools in Salt Lake County, Utah
Charter schools in Utah
Buildings and structures in West Jordan, Utah
Educational institutions established in 2004
2004 establishments in Utah
Salt Lake Community College